Learotha Williams (born c. 1967) is an American historian. He is a professor of African-American and Public History at Tennessee State University.

Early life
Williams was born circa 1967 in Tallahassee, Florida. He graduated from Florida State University, where he earned a bachelor's degree followed by a master's degree and a PhD, completed in 2003.

Career
Williams taught African-American history at Armstrong State University from 2004 to 2009. He is now a professor of African American and Public History at Tennessee State University.

Williams researches the history of African-American slaves in Nashville, Tennessee prior to the American Civil War of 1861–1865, including the slave auctions that were held on Charlotte Avenue. He spearheaded the installation of a historical marker on the corner of Fourth Avenue and Charlotte Avenue, which was dedicated on December 7, 2018.

Williams also researches the history of North Nashville, a predominantly black neighborhood, as part of the North Nashville Heritage Project. He has interviewed residents and business owners on its main thoroughfare, Jefferson Street.

References

Living people
1960s births
People from Tallahassee, Florida
Florida State University alumni
Tennessee State University faculty
20th-century American historians
American male non-fiction writers
21st-century American historians
21st-century American male writers
Public historians
African-American historians
Historians from Florida
20th-century American male writers
20th-century African-American writers
21st-century African-American writers
African-American male writers